Jardín is the debut studio album by singer Gabriel Garzón-Montano. It was released on January 27, 2017 by Stones Throw Records. The album was supported by three singles: "Sour Mango", "The Game", and "Crawl". The album was fully produced, arranged, composed and performed by the multi-instrumentalist and vocalist.

Critical reception 
Jardín received a positive critical reception. At Metacritic, which assigns a normalized rating out of 100 to reviews from mainstream publications, the album received an average score of 81, based on seven reviews. Q noted that "what really elevates the songs though, is the underlying weave of Latin-influenced percussion and subtle string arrangements which draw deftly on Garzon-Montano's French-Colombian roots". Elias Leight of Pitchfork said that "Montano settles on an unusual and fertile combination of sounds, knitting together the burnished, languorous acts of the late '60s and early '70s—the Association, Todd Rundgren—with lean, hair-trigger grooves. The result is heavy on pearly funk and pop, live instrumentation and harmony... Similarly heaped vocal passages, teeming with good ideas, are everywhere on the second half of Jardín. Montano especially enjoys contrasting blocky, beeline melodies from A to B with more scenic paths, as if to gently chide ruthless, shortest-route-best-route songwriters."

Track listing

Personnel
 Gabriel Garzón-Montano – producer, arranger, primary artist, composer, performer
 David Frazier Jr. – drums on "The Game" and "Crawl"
 Alex Frenkel – guitars, effects, processing on "Bombo Fabrika" and "My Balloon"
 Joshua Modney (violin), Megan Atchley (violin), Mariel Roberts (cello) – strings on "Trial", "Sour Mango", "Bombo Fabrika"
 Luna Garzón-Montano – additional vocals on "Bombo Fabrika"
 Henry Hirsch – mixing and recording at Waterfront Studios, Hudson, New York
 Heba Kadry – mastering at Timeless Mastering, New York, New York

References

2017 debut albums
American music
Stones Throw Records albums